The rosy-patched bushshrike (Rhodophoneus cruentus) is a species of bird in the family Malaconotidae. It is monotypic within the genus Rhodophoneus.
It is found in Djibouti, Egypt, Eritrea, Ethiopia, Kenya, Somalia, Sudan, and Tanzania.
Its natural habitat is subtropical or tropical dry shrubland.

Gallery

References

rosy-patched bushshrike
Birds of the Horn of Africa
rosy-patched bushshrike
Taxonomy articles created by Polbot
Taxa named by Christian Gottfried Ehrenberg